2 Samuel 7 is the seventh chapter of the Second Book of Samuel in the Old Testament of the Christian Bible or the second part of Books of Samuel in the Hebrew Bible. According to Jewish tradition the book was attributed to the prophet Samuel, with additions by the prophets Gad and Nathan, but modern scholars view it as a composition of a number of independent texts of various ages from c. 630–540 BCE. This chapter contains the account of David's reign in Jerusalem. This is within a section comprising 2 Samuel 2–8 which deals with the period when David set up his kingdom.

Text
This chapter was originally written in the Hebrew language. It is divided into 29 verses.

Textual witnesses
Some early manuscripts containing the text of this chapter in Hebrew are of the Masoretic Text tradition, which includes the Codex Cairensis (895), Aleppo Codex (10th century), and Codex Leningradensis (1008). Fragments containing parts of this chapter in Hebrew were found among the Dead Sea Scrolls including 4Q51 (4QSam; 100–50 BCE) with extant verses 6–7, 22–29.

Extant ancient manuscripts of a translation into Koine Greek known as the Septuagint (originally was made in the last few centuries BCE) include Codex Vaticanus (B; B; 4th century) and Codex Alexandrinus (A; A; 5th century).

Old Testament references
: 
:

Analysis
This chapter deals with two important issues, building a temple and succession to David's
throne; an introduction to succession narratives in 2 Samuel 9–10 and 1 Kings 1–2. It is one of the most important section in the Hebrew Bible (or Old Testament) and has been subject to intense research.

There are three scenes in this chapter:
1. David and Nathan: David proposed a "house" for the Ark of the Covenant (7:1–3)
2. Nathan and God: the divine oracle
a. God, who redeemed Israel, decides on his house (7:4–7)
b. (wě‘attâ) God will build a house for David (7:8–17)
3. David and God: David's response
a. David praises God's redemptive acts (7:18-24)
b. (wě‘attâ) David's prayer (7:25–29)

The second and third scenes are in parallel, with the first section of each scene recalling God's redemptive acts (specifically referring to the Exodus from Egypt), and the second section, introduced with wě‘attâ (could be rendered as "and now" or "now therefore"; 2 Samuel 7:8, 25), signaling a consequence based on the premise in the first section.

Oracles on the House for God and House of David (7:1–17)

Verses 1–17 appear to be one unit, although it contains two separate oracles concerning two different issues:
 The appropriateness of constructing a temple (verses 1–7)
 The succession to David's throne (verses 8–16)

King David consulted Nathan, a court-prophet and king's advisor, about his  intention to build a temple to house the Ark of the Covenant; similar divine consultations for building temples were found in extra-biblical parallels, such as in the Egyptian Königsnovelle. Nathan then conveyed the first oracle of YHWH (verses 5 and 7) that David was prohibited from building a temple for YHWH in Jerusalem (1 Chronicles 22:8; 28:3; 1 Kings 5:17). Nathan later support Solomon, son of David, to be king (1 Kings 1–2) and to build a Solomonic temple.
The second oracle (verses 8–16) addresses a different issue, succession to David's throne, linked to the first by the same historical setting (verses 1–3) and by employing the word bayit ("house") in two different ways: David was not allowed to build for YHWH a 'house' (bayit, verses 5, 6, 13), but YHWH was going to establish for David a 'dynasty' (bayit, verses 11, 16; thus, "house" of David).  The core message of the second oracle is as follows: David had been called by God (verse 9) and protected against his enemies and made into a great name (verse 10); God would raise up his son to succeed him and would establish his kingdom (verse 12) and he would enjoy the status of God's son (verse 14). Additional elements are God's care of the
people of Israel (verses 10–11), the eternity of David's kingdom (verses 13,16) and the contrast between David and Saul (verses 14b–15). The combined theme of David's greatness and the certainty of succession can be found in between this oracle and other texts, such as Psalm 89 by Ethan the Ezrahite.
In 1 Kings 5:3–4, Solomon explained that while David was given "rest" from his enemies, it was not to the higher degree of "rest" given to Solomon, with neither "adversary nor misfortune" to impede the
Temple's construction, as the fulfillment of 
God's covenant to 'give Israel rest from its adversaries' (Deuteronomy 12:10 and 25:19), to 'fight Israel's battles' (Deuteronomy 3:22), and to 'bestow on them the Promised Land'.

Verses 1–2
 Now it came to pass when the king was dwelling in his house, and the Lord had given him rest from all his enemies all around,  that the king said to Nathan the prophet, “See now, I dwell in a house of cedar, but the ark of God dwells inside tent curtains.”
"Nathan the prophet": played important roles in three key junctures of David's reign: (1) gave oracle of the House of God and House of David (2 Samuel 7), (2) conveyed God's rebuke for David's adultery with Bathsheba (2 Samuel 12), (3) prompted the aged David to declare Solomon as his successor (1 Kings 1), while being a prophetic advisor for David (2 Chronicles 29:25) and a biographer of David and Solomon (1 Chronicles 29:29; 2 Chronicles 9:29).

Verse 14
[YHWH says] "I will be his father, and he shall be my son. If he commit iniquity, I will chasten him with the rod of men, and with the stripes of the children of men:"
"stripes": "blows" (NKJV) or "strokes"

Verse 16
[YHWH says] "And your house and your kingdom shall be established forever before you. Your throne shall be established forever."
"Before you": Septuagint reads "before me".

The prayer of David (7:18–29)
The second half of the chapter contains David's prayer, which could be connected with bringing the ark to Jerusalem (6:1–19) rather than with the dynastic oracle in 7:1–7. In addition there were allusions to God's promise and its 'eternal' nature (verses 22, 28–29), God's redemption of his people from Egypt (verses 23–24), and several Deuteronomistic themes (verses 22b–26).

Verse 23
And who is like Your people, like Israel, the one nation on the earth whom God went to redeem for Himself as a people, to make for Himself a name—and to do for Yourself great and awesome deeds for Your land—before Your people whom You redeemed for Yourself from Egypt, the nations, and their gods?
"For Your land": according to Masoretic Text. Septuagint version reads "to drive out" as in 1 Chronicles 17:21.

See also

Related Bible parts: 2 Samuel 12, 1 Kings 1, 1 Chronicles 29, 2 Chronicles 9, Psalm 89

Notes

References

Sources

Commentaries on Samuel

General

External links
 Jewish translations:
 Samuel II - II Samuel - Chapter 7 (Judaica Press). Hebrew text and English translation [with Rashi's commentary] at Chabad.org
 Christian translations:
 Online Bible at GospelHall.org (ESV, KJV, Darby, American Standard Version, Bible in Basic English)
 2 Samuel chapter 7. Bible Gateway

07